Chhaju Ram Jat Senior Secondary School, Hisar is a college located on Delhi road in Hisar in the Indian state of Haryana.

History
In 1928, the privately funded Jat High school was founded by the Seth Chhaju Ram (1881-1945) who made fortune in Colcatta during the British Raj. The college is now run by the non-profit Jat Educational Institutions society, which also runs Jat Dharamshala, 
CRM JAT College, Chhaju Ram Law College, Hisar, Chhaju Ram College of Education, Hisar, Chhaju Ram Jat Senior Secondary School, Hisar and Chhaju Ram Public School, Hisar.

Academics
The schools offer classes till 10+2.

See also 
 List of Universities and Colleges in Hisar
 List of schools in Hisar
 List of institutions of higher education in Haryana

External links 
 Official website
 Google map

References 

Schools in Hisar (city)
Private schools in Haryana
Boys' schools in India